The Little Illini Conference is a high school athletic conference in East Central Illinois that is a member of the Illinois High School Association. A group of small schools near the Indiana border, Little Illini is known for its strong football squads, in particular Casey-Westfield, who has won one state football championship  The conference has undergone significant rearrangement in the past decade with the addition of several larger schools from the Apollo Conference driving many smaller schools to other conferences.

History
The conference origins are twofold, the first iteration dates back to 1970 where the charter members included Casey, Marshall, Martinsville, Oblong, Palestine and Toledo-Cumberland. In 1972, St. Elmo joined the league and it maintained as a seven team conference until 1981, when Palestine left. As for the remaining teams, they would play their last season of football in 1983, leaving for other conferences.

The conference would rise again in 1996 with some familiar names as well as some new teams. The second incarnation of the league included Albion-Edwards County, Casey-Westfield, Marshall, Martinsville, Oblong and Toledo-Cumberland. Palestine would return to the fold in 1997 with Bridgeport-Red Hill and Lawrenceville joining in 2001. Flora would join the conference in 2003, however, by 2008 Martinsville would leave the league. 

The conference has been strong in volleyball with Cumberland reaching the Class 1A final four three straight times from 2008-2010. Edwards County took third place in Class 1A in 2007.

In 2014 several schools, including Cumberland, Palestine-Hutsonville and Oblong left the Little Illini Conference to join the Little Okaw Valley Conference in central Illinois while Paris High School joined the conference. This followed the addition of Newton, Olney and Robinson high schools, which had been longtime members of the Apollo Conference.

Edwards County left the LIC for the Black Diamond Conference in 2016. They became an affiliate member in the BDC for baseball and softball from 2014/2015-2015/2016.

In 2020 Mount Carmel High School announced they would join the conference starting the 2021-22 school year. While Flora announced they would be departing to the Black Diamond Conference and Red Hill would depart as well.

Member Schools

Membership timeline

See also
 List of Illinois High School Association member conferences

References

External links
 Little Illini Conference website

1970 establishments in Illinois
Illinois high school sports conferences